Simon Colton (London, 1973) is a British computer scientist, currently working as Professor of Computational Creativity in the Game AI Research Group at Queen Mary University of London, UK and in the Sensilab at Monash University, Australia. He previously worked as Professor in the Metamakers Institute at Falmouth University, UK and led the Computational Creativity Research Groups at Goldsmiths, University of London and at Imperial College, London in the positions of professor and reader, respectively. He graduated from the University of Durham with a degree in mathematics, gained an MSc. in Pure Mathematics at the University of Liverpool, and finally a PhD in Artificial Intelligence from the University of Edinburgh, under the supervision of Professor Alan Bundy.

Colton is the driving force behind thepaintingfool.com, an artificial intelligence that he hopes will one day be accepted as an artist in its own right. His work, along with that of Maja Pantic and Michel Valstar, won the British Computing Society Machine Intelligence Award in 2007. The work has also been the subject of some media attention.

Prior to his work on The Painting Fool, Colton worked on the HR tool, a reasoning tool that was applied to discover mathematical concepts. The system successfully discovered theorems and conjectures, some of which were novel enough to become published works. Colton's work with HM included the discovery of refactorable numbers, which appeared to be original but turned out to have been previously discovered.

References

External links 
 The Computational Creativity Research Group at Goldsmiths, University of London
 Simon Colton's Goldsmiths page

1973 births
Living people
British computer scientists
Alumni of Durham University
Alumni of the University of Liverpool
Alumni of the University of Edinburgh
Academics of Imperial College London